Korus may refer to:

 Korus, Iran
 South Korea–United States Free Trade Agreement (KORUS)
 New Zealand national korfball team, nicknamed "The Korus"
 Max Korus (born 1988), American professional racing cyclist

See also

Koru (disambiguation)
Corus (disambiguation)
Chorus (disambiguation)